In operator theory, a multiplication operator is an operator  defined on some vector space of functions and whose value at a function  is given by multiplication by a fixed function . That is,

This type of operator is often contrasted with composition operators.  Multiplication operators generalize the notion of operator given by a diagonal matrix. More precisely, one of the results of operator theory is a spectral theorem that states that every self-adjoint operator on a Hilbert space is unitarily equivalent to a multiplication operator on an L2 space.

Example 
Consider the Hilbert space  of complex-valued square integrable functions on the interval . With , define the operator

Its spectrum will be the interval  (the range of the function  defined on ). Indeed, for any complex number , the operator  is given by

which is another multiplication operator. 

This can be easily generalized to characterizing the norm and spectrum of a multiplication operator on any Lp space.

See also 
 Translation operator
 Shift operator
 Transfer operator
 Decomposition of spectrum (functional analysis)

Notes

References 

Functional analysis